The Metro Football League (MFL) is one of two community based football leagues based in Perth, Western Australia. The league is made up of 10 clubs over two divisions.

History 

Formerly known as the Mercantile Football Association, the league had its origins as a social league playing fortnightly in the late 1980s. Some of the clubs were Cockburn Cement, Komatsu and the Rosemount Hotel.

A change in the administration in the late 1990s saw a more formalised competition, meaning incorporation of the league, board of control, a regular season, transfers, and accredited umpires officiating. New clubs joining had more of a community base, rather than social or workplace, with some of those being Quinns and Ellenbrook. 

Transitions in the clubs occurred also, with Cockburn Cement becoming Cockburn and based in that suburb. Yanchep and Dwellingup also became active in promoting the game and junior development in their areas. 

The league made headlines in 2009 when former Richmond AFL player Andrew Krakouer, imprisoned for assault, played for the Wooroloo Prison Farm football team whilst serving his sentence. The Wooroloo team went through the season undefeated and won the grand final.

The Mercantile Football Association (MFA) changed its name to Metro Football League (MFL) in 2012.

Bayswater and Queens Park joined the MFL for season 2013, with Baldivis, Secret Harbour leaving the MFL.

The MFL occupies an important niche in the football community by hosting and fostering new clubs.  This is done with sound football management with cost effective administration and therefore promotes its member clubs to invest their economies in to their own infrastructure.  The success of the format can be seen by the number of new member clubs the MFL has helped establish and watches from afar as they flourish in other competitions that can accommodate their needs.

Current clubs

Former clubs

Grand final results 

Division 1

Division 2

Notes:(1) In 2015, there was only one division.  The Division 2 Premiership was decided in a Round Robin series between teams that missed the finals.(2) In 2016, the competition split into two divisions of 5 teams after Round 11 based on ladder positions.  The bottom five teams played for the Division 2 Premiership for the remaining 8 rounds.

Division 1 Reserves

References

Sport in Perth, Western Australia
Australian rules football competitions in Western Australia